"Sad Song" is the lead single by singer-songwriter Blake Lewis from his second studio album Heartbreak on Vinyl, released on October 6, 2009 and has reached the number eleven spots on Billboard's Hot Dance Club Songs chart in 2009.

Music video
"Sad Song" directed by Ana Veselic, has a very stylized look that blends a couple of different eras. Blake says: "The video is very film noir with an '80s feel to it, like we have the Maxell shot in there."

The video is shot as a 1940s film-noir style story about the end of a couple’s relationship, highlighted with some 40s-meets-80s style fashion and video editing. The female lead is played by Casey Carlson who was also an American Idol contestant in the recent season 8.

Blake says: "I was, like, Wow, this girl has the most beautiful face. It's very classic. So I reached out to her, and she said yes. We got the video done a couple weeks ago, and it turned out really, really well. I'm very proud of it"

The Video was released on September 21, 2009, one day prior to the official release on his MySpace.

Track listing
Sad Song (Radio Edit) 

Sad Song [Maxi-Single]  

Sad Song [Remixes]

Chart performance
"Sad Song" spent ten weeks on the Hot Dance Club Songs chart and has reached number eleven on November 14, 2009.

References

External links
 Official Website
 

2009 singles
Songs written by Sam Hollander
Songs written by Dave Katz
2009 songs
Tommy Boy Records singles
Songs written by Blake Lewis